James Arnold Bradford (October 18, 1933November 16, 2020) was a rancher, teacher, politician and Democratic member of the South Dakota Senate, representing the 27th district between 2009 and 2017. He first was elected to office in the South Dakota House of Representatives. He was an Oglala Sioux.

Career
Bradford had a career as a public school teacher before deciding to run for office. He lived on the Pine Ridge Indian Reservation, where he also had a ranch.

Political career
Bradford was first elected to office as a Democratic member of the state House of Representatives.

In 2008, he switched parties to the Republican Party after having lost the Democratic primary to the incumbent Democratic senator Theresa Two Bulls. No Republican opposed him, and he narrowly won the election over Two Bulls by 277 votes. A year after winning re-election to the state senate, Bradford switched back to the Democratic Party.

References

External links

 South Dakota Legislature - Jim Bradford official SD House website

 Project Vote Smart - Representative James 'Jim' Bradford (SD) profile
 Follow the Money - Jim Bradford
 2008 2006 2004
 2002 2000 campaign contributions

1933 births
2020 deaths

21st-century American politicians
Members of the South Dakota House of Representatives
Native American state legislators in South Dakota
South Dakota Democrats
South Dakota Republicans
South Dakota state senators
People from Pine Ridge, South Dakota